Saint-Aubin-du-Perron is a former commune in the Manche department in Normandy in north-western France. On 1 January 2019, it was merged into the new commune Saint-Sauveur-Villages. It has 258 inhabitants (2019). In 1823 it yielded a part of its territory for the creation of the commune Le Mesnilbus.

See also
Communes of the Manche department

References

Saintaubinduperron